Teddy Louise Kasella-Bantu was a Member of Parliament in the National Assembly of Tanzania.

Sources

Living people
Members of the National Assembly (Tanzania)
Year of birth missing (living people)